The Meistriliiga (EML), also known as the Coolbet Hokiliiga for sponsorship reasons, is the top-tier ice hockey league in Estonia. The league currently consists of five teams from Estonia and two teams from Riga, Latvia.

History
The league was formed in the 1990–91 season. Since 1945–46, Estonian teams had participated in the Estonian SSR Championship. Prior to the country's annexation and incorporation into the Soviet Union, the Estonian Championship had been contested in interwar Estonia from 1934 to 1940. In the 2017–18 season, the league was known as the Nordic Power Hokiliiga.

Narva PSK has dominated the league at the outset, winning the first six championships and eight of the first 11 seasons. Since winning their first title in 1997, Tartu Kalev-Välk has been the most consistently successful team in the Meistriliiga since the league started, having won a total of nine championships. HK Stars claimed four titles in five years from 2005 to 2009.

Teams

Current teams

Former teams

Title holders

Estonian Championship years
1934: Tallinn Kalev
1935: not played
1936: Tartu ASK
1937: Tallinn Kalev
1938: not played
1939: Tartu ASK
1940: Tallinn Sport
1941–1945: not played

Estonian SSR Championship years
1946: Dünamo Tallinn
1947: Dünamo Tartu
1948: Dünamo Tallinn
1949: Dünamo Tallinn
1950: Tallinn LTM
1951: Tallinn LTM
1952: Dünamo Tallinn
1953: Dünamo Tallinn
1954: Dünamo Tallinn
1955: Dünamo Tartu
1956: Kohtla-Järve Kalev
1957: Dünamo Tartu
1958: Tallinn Kalev
1959: Tallinn Kalev
1960: Tallinn Kalev
1961: Tallinn Kalev
1962: Tallinn Kalev
1963: Tallinn Ekskavaator
1964: Tallinn Taksopark
1965: Tallinn Tempo
1966: Tallinn Ekskavaator
1967: Narva Kreenholm
1968: Tallinn Tempo
1969: Narva Kreenholm
1970: Kohtla-Järve HK Keemik
1971: Narva Kreenholm
1972: Kohtla-Järve HK Keemik
1973: Narva Kreenholm
1974: Kohtla-Järve HK Keemik
1975: Narva Kreenholm
1976: Kohtla-Järve HK Keemik
1977: Kohtla-Järve HK Keemik
1978: Tallinn Talleks
1979: Kohtla-Järve HK Keemik
1980: Kohtla-Järve HK Keemik
1981: Tallinn Talleks
1982: Sillamäe Kalev
1983: Kohtla-Järve HK Keemik
1984: Kohtla-Järve HK Keemik
1985: Kohtla-Järve HK Keemik
1986: Narva Kreenholm
1987: Kohtla-Järve HK Keemik
1988: Narva Kreenholm
1989: Kohtla-Järve HK Keemik
1990: Narva Kreenholm II

Meistriliiga years
1991: Narva Kreenholm II
1992: Narva Kreenholm
1993: Narva Kreenholm
1994: Narva Kreenholm
1995: Narva Kreenholm
1996: Narva Kreenholm
1997: Tartu Välk 494
1998: Narva Kreenholm
1999: Tartu Välk 494
2000: Tartu Välk 494
2001: Narva 2000
2002: Tartu Välk 494
2003: Tartu Välk 494
2004: HC Panter
2005: HK Stars
2006: HK Stars
2007: HK Stars
2008: Tartu Kalev-Välk
2009: HK Stars
2010: Kohtla-Järve Viru Sputnik
2011: Tartu Kalev-Välk
2012: Tartu Kalev-Välk
2013: Viiking Sport
2014: Viiking Sport
2015: Tartu Kalev-Välk
2016: Narva PSK
2017: Narva PSK
2018: HC Viking
2019: Tartu Välk 494
2020: Tartu Välk 494
2021: Tartu Välk 494
2022: Tartu Välk 494

Titles by team

Notes

References

External links
Official website
Meistriliiga on eurohockey.com
Meistriliiga on eliteprospects.com

 
Ice hockey leagues in Estonia
Top tier ice hockey leagues in Europe
Ice hockey
Recurring sporting events established in 1934
1934 establishments in Estonia